Pierfrancesco di Lorenzo (II) de' Medici (1487–1525), known as  il Giovane  ("the Younger") was an Italian banker and a member of the House of Medici.

He was born in Florence, the son of Lorenzo il Popolano. Differently from the latter, he did not take in part in the city's politics, acting as Florentine ambassador only one time in 1522 in the Papal States.

In 1511 he married Maria Soderini. They had four children, including the infamous Lorenzino, killer of Duke Alessandro de' Medici.

Pierfrancesco died at Cafaggiolo in 1525.

1487 births
1525 deaths
Pierfrancesco 2
Italian bankers
16th-century people of the Republic of Florence
Ambassadors of the Republic of Florence